Harry Nyquist (February 7, 1889 – April 4, 1976) was a Swedish-American physicist and electronic engineer who made important contributions to communication theory.

Personal life
Nyquist was born in the village Nilsby of the parish Stora Kil, Värmland, Sweden. He was the son of Lars Jonsson Nyqvist (1847–1930) and Catarina (or Katrina) Eriksdotter (1857–1920). His parents had eight children: Elin Teresia, Astrid, Selma, Harry Theodor, Amelie, Olga Maria, Axel Martin and Herta Alfrida. He emigrated to the United States in 1907.

Education
He entered the University of North Dakota in 1912 and received B.S. and M.S. degrees in electrical engineering in 1914 and 1915, respectively. He received a Ph.D. in physics at Yale University in 1917.

Career
He worked at AT&T's Department of Development and Research from 1917 to 1934, and continued when it became Bell Telephone Laboratories that year, until his retirement in 1954.

Nyquist received the IRE Medal of Honor in 1960 for "fundamental contributions to a quantitative understanding of thermal noise, data transmission and negative feedback."  
In October 1960 he was awarded the Stuart Ballantine Medal of the Franklin Institute "for his theoretical analyses and practical inventions in the field of communications systems during the past forty years including, particularly, his original work in the theories of telegraph transmission, thermal noise in electric conductors, and in the history of feedback systems." 
In 1969 he was awarded the National Academy of Engineering's fourth Founder's Medal "in recognition of his many fundamental contributions to engineering."
In 1975 Nyquist received together with Hendrik Bode the Rufus Oldenburger Medal from the American Society of Mechanical Engineers.

As reported in The Idea Factory: Bell Labs and the Great Age of American Innovation, the Bell Labs patent lawyers wanted to know why some people were so much more productive (in terms of patents) than others. After crunching a lot of data, they found that the only thing the productive employees had in common (other than having made it through the Bell Labs hiring process) was that "Workers with the most patents often shared lunch or breakfast with a Bell Labs electrical engineer named Harry Nyquist. It wasn't the case that Nyquist gave them specific ideas. Rather, as one scientist recalled, 'he drew people out, got them thinking'" (p. 135).

Nyquist lived in Pharr, Texas after his retirement, and died in Harlingen, Texas on April 4, 1976.

Technical contributions
As an engineer at Bell Laboratories, Nyquist did important work on thermal noise ("Johnson–Nyquist noise"), the stability of feedback amplifiers, telegraphy, facsimile, television, and other important communications problems.  With Herbert E. Ives, he helped to develop AT&T's first facsimile machines that were made public in 1924. In 1932, he published a classic paper on stability of feedback amplifiers.  The Nyquist stability criterion can now be found in many textbooks on feedback control theory.

His early theoretical work on determining the bandwidth requirements for transmitting information laid the foundations for later advances by Claude Shannon, which led to the development of information theory.  In particular, Nyquist determined that the number of independent pulses that could be put through a telegraph channel per unit time is limited to twice the bandwidth of the channel, and published his results in the papers Certain factors affecting telegraph speed (1924) and Certain topics in Telegraph Transmission Theory (1928).  This rule is essentially a dual of what is now known as the Nyquist–Shannon sampling theorem.

Terms named for Harry Nyquist
 Nyquist rate: sampling rate twice the bandwidth of the signal's waveform being sampled; sampling faster than this rate assures that the waveform can be reconstructed accurately.
 Nyquist frequency: half the sample rate of a system; signal frequencies below this value are unambiguously represented.
 Nyquist filter
 Nyquist plot
 Nyquist ISI criterion
 Nyquist (programming language)
 Nyquist stability criterion

References

External links

 IEEE Global History Network page about Nyquist
 Nyquist criterion page with photo of Nyquist with John R. Pierce and Rudy Kompfner
 K.J.Astrom: Nyquist and his seminal papers, 2005 presentation
 Nyquist biography, p. 2

1889 births
1976 deaths
People from Kil Municipality
American electronics engineers
AT&T people
Control theorists
IEEE Medal of Honor recipients
American information theorists
Information theory
Scientists at Bell Labs
University of North Dakota alumni
Yale University alumni
Swedish emigrants to the United States
People from Pharr, Texas
Mathematicians from Texas
20th-century American engineers
Fellows of the American Physical Society